The 1985 Overseas Final was the fifth running of the Overseas Final as part of the qualification for the 1985 Speedway World Championship Final, which like the Overseas Final was held at the Odsal Stadium in Bradford, England. The 1985 Final was run on 14 July and was the second last qualifying round for Commonwealth and American riders.

The Top 10 riders qualified for the Intercontinental Final to be held in Vetlanda, Sweden.

1985 Overseas Final
14 July
 Bradford, Odsal Stadium
Qualification: Top 10 plus 1 reserve to the Intercontinental Final in Vetlanda, Sweden

References

See also
 Motorcycle Speedway

1985
World Individual